Saint-Hilaire may refer to:

Places

France
 Saint-Hilaire, Allier, in the Allier department
 Saint-Hilaire, Aude, in the Aude department
 Saint-Hilaire, Doubs, in the Doubs department
 Saint-Hilaire, Essonne, in the Essonne department
 Saint-Hilaire, Haute-Garonne, in the Haute-Garonne department
 Saint-Hilaire, Haute-Loire, in the Haute-Loire department
 Saint-Hilaire, Isère, also known as Saint-Hilaire du Touvet, in the Isère department
 Saint-Hilaire, Lot, in the Lot department
 Saint-Hilaire, Puy-de-Dôme, in the Puy-de-Dôme department
 Saint-Hilaire-au-Temple, in the Marne department
 Saint-Hilaire-Bonneval, in the Haute-Vienne department
 Saint-Hilaire-Cottes, in the Pas-de-Calais department
 Saint-Hilaire-Cusson-la-Valmitte, in the Loire department
 Saint-Hilaire-de-Beauvoir, in the Hérault department
 Saint-Hilaire-de-Brens, in the Isère department
 Saint-Hilaire-de-Brethmas, in the Gard department
 Saint-Hilaire-de-Briouze, in the Orne department
 Saint-Hilaire-de-Chaléons, in the Loire-Atlantique department
 Saint-Hilaire-de-Clisson, in the Loire-Atlantique department
 Saint-Hilaire-de-Court, in the Cher department
 Saint-Hilaire-de-Gondilly, in the Cher department
 Saint-Hilaire-de-la-Côte, in the Isère department
 Saint-Hilaire-de-la-Noaille, in the Gironde department
 Saint-Hilaire-de-Lavit, in the Lozère department
 Saint-Hilaire-de-Loulay, in the Vendée department
 Saint-Hilaire-de-Lusignan, in the Lot-et-Garonne department
 Saint-Hilaire-de-Riez, in the Vendée department
 Saint-Hilaire-des-Landes, in the Ille-et-Vilaine department
 Saint-Hilaire-des-Loges, in the Vendée department
 Saint-Hilaire-d'Estissac, in the Dordogne department
 Saint-Hilaire-de-Villefranche, in the Charente-Maritime department
 Saint-Hilaire-de-Voust, in the Vendée department
 Saint-Hilaire-d'Ozilhan, in the Gard department
 Saint-Hilaire-du-Bois, Charente-Maritime, in the Charente-Maritime department
 Saint-Hilaire-du-Bois, Gironde, in the Gironde department
 Saint-Hilaire-du-Harcouët, in the Manche department
 Saint-Hilaire-du-Maine, in the Mayenne department
 Saint-Hilaire-du-Rosier, in the Isère department
 Saint-Hilaire-en-Lignières, in the Cher department
 Saint-Hilaire-en-Morvan, in the Nièvre department
 Saint-Hilaire-en-Woëvre, in the Meuse department
 Saint-Hilaire-Foissac, in the Corrèze department
 Saint-Hilaire-Fontaine, in the Nièvre department
 Saint-Hilaire-la-Croix, in the Puy-de-Dôme department
 Saint-Hilaire-la-Forêt, in the Vendée department
 Saint-Hilaire-la-Gérard, in the Orne department
 Saint-Hilaire-la-Gravelle, in the Loir-et-Cher department
 Saint-Hilaire-la-Palud, in the Deux-Sèvres department
 Saint-Hilaire-la-Plaine, in the Creuse department
 Saint-Hilaire-la-Treille, in the Haute-Vienne department
 Saint-Hilaire-le-Château, in the Creuse department
 Saint-Hilaire-le-Châtel, in the Orne department
 Saint-Hilaire-le-Grand, in the Marne department
 Saint-Hilaire-le-Lierru, in the Sarthe department
 Saint-Hilaire-le-Petit, in the Marne department
 Saint-Hilaire-les-Andrésis, in the Loiret department
 Saint-Hilaire-les-Courbes, in the Corrèze department
 Saint-Hilaire-les-Monges, in the Puy-de-Dôme department
 Saint-Hilaire-les-Places, in the Haute-Vienne department
 Saint-Hilaire-le-Vouhis, in the Vendée department
 Saint-Hilaire-lez-Cambrai, in the Nord department
 Saint-Hilaire-Luc, in the Corrèze department
 Saint-Hilaire-Petitville, in the Manche department
 Saint-Hilaire-Peyroux, in the Corrèze department
 Saint-Hilaire-Saint-Mesmin, in the Loiret department
 Saint-Hilaire-sous-Charlieu, in the Loire department
 Saint-Hilaire-sous-Romilly, in the Aube department
 Saint-Hilaire-sur-Benaize, in the Indre department
 Saint-Hilaire-sur-Erre, in the Orne department
 Saint-Hilaire-sur-Helpe, in the Nord department
 Saint-Hilaire-sur-Puiseaux, in the Loiret department
 Saint-Hilaire-sur-Risle, in the Orne department
 Saint-Hilaire-sur-Yerre, in the Eure-et-Loir department
 Saint-Hilaire-Taurieux, in the Corrèze department
 Barbezieux-Saint-Hilaire, a commune in the Charente department

Canada
 St. Hilaire, New Brunswick, a former village, now part of Haut-Madawaska
 Saint-Hilaire Parish, New Brunswick
 Mont-Saint-Hilaire, Quebec, a city in the province of Quebec
 Mont Saint-Hilaire, the mountain after which the city was named
 Saint-Hilaire-de-Dorset, Quebec, a parish in the province of Quebec

United States
 St. Hilaire, Minnesota, a city in Pennington County

People
 Augustin Saint-Hilaire (1799–1853), French botanist and traveler
 Caroline St-Hilaire (born 1969), Canadian politician
 Étienne Geoffroy Saint-Hilaire, (1772–1844), French zoologist
 Isidore Geoffroy Saint-Hilaire, (1805–1861), his son, also a zoologist
 Jean Henri Jaume Saint-Hilaire (1772–1845), French botanist
 Jules Barthélemy-Saint-Hilaire (1805–1895), French philosopher, journalist and statesman
 Louis Vincent Le Blond de Saint-Hilaire, (1766–1809), French general
 Marcus St Hilaire (born 1977), English rugby league player

See also
 Hilaire (disambiguation)
 Hilary of Poitiers or Saint Hilarius, 4th-century bishop and Church Father
 Pope Hilarius or Pope Hilary, 5th-century pope
 Hilary of Arles or Saint Hilarius, 5th-century bishop
 Saint Hilarion, anchorite